Released during Q3 2007 for T-Mobile in the US, the Samsung Blast (SGH-T729) slider features a double-tap QWERTY keypad, music player, stereo bluetooth and a MicroSD slot.

Features 
 Thin and light slider-style design
 1.3-megapixel camera 4x zoom with multishot and camcorder capabilities 
 Bluetooth wireless capability for headsets, synchronizing with PCs or phones
 Quad-band GSM ("Worldphone") capability
 Built-in MP3 player with stereo Bluetooth 2.0 wireless technology to listen to music without wires
 Check email via POP3, IMAP4, and SMTP protocols
 Half QWERTY keypad (aka double-tap)
 MicroSD slot. Supports up to 2 GB (officially) though some users have reported being able to use 4 GB cards.

Capabilities and applications 
Direct access to personal email, including AOL email, Yahoo! Mail and Gmail, making it easy to check messages anytime of the day. For added convenience, email messages can be read and responded to for the same pricing as text and picture messages - meaning there's no required data package to purchase. The Blast is a stylish ultra-thin slider offering additional features, including access to instant messaging with built-in support for AOL Instant Messenger (AIM), ICQ, Windows Live Messenger and Yahoo! Messenger, stereo Bluetooth technology, a 1.3-megapixel camera with digital zoom, multi-shot, and video recording capabilities, external memory card slot, MP3 player and speaker independent voice recognition. Users also can stay connected while traveling worldwide with the Blast's quad-band technology.

Calculator 
Allows the user to use the phone as a basic calculator.
Other included functions:
 ^
 ln
 Sq Root
 exo
 X!
 sin
 cos
 tan
 pi

E-mail 
The E-mail application supports up to 4 accounts. Note that E-mail uses SMS messages and may incur charges.

 AOL
 Yahoo
 Custom 1
 Custom 2

If there are problems signing into a gmail or other webmail account, make sure that it supports POP3 or IMAP. POP3 and IMAP can be enabled on gmail via Settings > Forwarding and POP/IMAP.

Image editor 
Allows the user to open up photos that have been taken (not downloaded images) and apply effects such as frames, emoticons, clipart and hue/contrast presets.

Instant messaging 
Note: instant messaging uses SMS messages (not data) and may incur charges depending on the plan.
 AOL
 ICQ
 Yahoo
 Windows Live

Media player 
Manufacturer: Samsung
Supported File Formats: 3GP, AAC, MP3, MP4

Synchronization 
Download or store the mobile phone's contact list to my.tmobile.com for later use.

As an alternative, the Samsung PC Studio can be used software to synchronize contacts and other data, transfer files, or use your phone as a modem (if the user has T-Mobile's internet plan).

Unit conversion 
 Currency (Manually enter updated exchange rates for accurate results)
 Length
 Weight
 Volume
 Area
 Temperature

World time 
Allows the user to view the current date and time of two locations simultaneously.

Defects 
 There have been reports of 2 GB MicroSD cards (specifically Kingston) not being recognized by the Samsung Blast while working in other devices. However, Sandisk and other brands seem to work fine.
 While not technically a defect, the Samsung Blast has a low call volume which is easily solved by using the hands-free accessory that comes with the phone. 
 Unofficial fix for low call volume. Use at own risk. Samsung Blast - Increasing Call Volume
Also, the microphone is ultra-sensitive to any contact made to the phone. Even slightly moving the phone can cause the user to cut out to the receiving person.

Specifications 
 Form factor: Slider
 Internal antenna

Audio

Battery 
 Specifications
 Type: Internal cell Li-Ion
 Milliamp hours: 800 mAh
 Battery voltage: 3.7 volts
 Battery housing/cover color: Red
 Liquid Damage Indicator (LDI): Top side ledge
 Charging time
 Travel charger: 3.0 hours
 Car charger: 3.0 hours
 Talk time
 Digital 1900 MHz: Up to 5 hours
 Digital 850 MHz: Up to 5 hours
 Standby time
 Digital 1900 MHz: Up to 200 hours (8.3 days)
 Digital 850 MHz: Up to 200 hours (8.3 days)

Bluetooth 
 Version: 2.0 + EDR (Enhanced Data Rate)
 Bluetooth 2400 MHz: 2402.0 – 2480.0 MHz
 Supported profiles:
 A2DP: Advanced Audio Distribution Profile
 BPP: Basic Printing Profile
 DUN: Dial-up networking Profile
 FTP: File Transfer Profile
 HFP: Hands-Free Profile
 HSP: Headset Profile
 OPP: Object Push Profile
 SPP: Serial Port Profile

Camera 
 Type: CMOS
 Physical location on handset: Top back of slider
 Image format: JPG
 Max storage capacity for pictures in phone memory: Up to 11 MB (shared memory)

Camera specifications
 Megapixel rating: 1.3 MP
 Resolution settings:

Image usability
 Wallpaper
 Caller ID Image
 Group ID Image
 Picture Mail

Camera controls and settings
 Self Timer: 3 sec, 5 sec, 10 sec
 Multi-Shot: 69, 15
 Multi-Shot Quality: Normal, High
 Shot Mosaic:
 2x2
 3x3
 Zoom:
 Digital: 4×
 Manual: 0 to 6
 White Balance:
 Auto
 Sunny/Daylight
 Cloudy
 Fluorescent
 Incandescent
 Color Tones:
 Auto
 Black and White
 Sepia
 Aqua
 Emboss
 Sketch
 Negative
 Fun Frames: 30

Messaging 
 Predictive Text Input: XT9 Easy Text Input
 E-mail capabilities: AOL, Yahoo, Custom 1, Custom 2
 Instant Messaging: AOL, ICQ, Yahoo, Windows Live

SMS/EMS
 EMS Added: Yes
 Total SMS/EMS Storage Capacity: 200, Push: 30
 Character Limit Per Message: 160
 SMS/EMS Concatenation (Link) support: Yes

MMS
 Total MMS storage capacity: Up to 11 MB
 Character limit per message: 1000

• Note: IM and e-mail both use text messages and may incur charges

Carriers 
The phone has been distributed in North America by the following carriers:
 T-Mobile (U.S.)

External links 
 Samsung T729 official page
 Mobiledia Information
 Official Comprehensive FAQ and Phone Information
 Cnet Review of the Samsung Blast

T729
Mobile phones introduced in 2007